KTB can mean:
Cretaceous-Paleogene boundary also known as Cretaceous-Tertiary boundary
Khatib MRT station (station abbreviation KTB), Yishun, Singapore
Krung Thai Bank, state-owned Thai commercial bank
KTB mechatronics (now qfix robotics), German industrial robotics company
ktb, ISO 639-3 code for the Kambaata language
KTB, IATA code for Thorne Bay seaplane base
K-T-B, triconsonantal root of a number of Semitic words
Kontinentales Tiefbohrprogramm der Bundesrepublik Deutschland (German Continental Deep Drilling Program), a German scientific project
KTB, stock symbol for Kontoor Brands